The Manitoba Liberal Party, a political party in the Canadian province of Manitoba, has chosen most of its leaders by delegated leadership conventions. Since 1993, the Manitoba Liberal Party has chosen its leaders by an open vote of party members, weighted by riding.

The party's first leader, Thomas Greenway, does not appear to have faced any formal opposition when he created the party in 1882/1883.

1906 leadership convention

(Held on March 28, 1906.)

Edward Brown, acclaimed

1910 leadership convention 

(Held April 5, 1910.)

Tobias Norris, acclaimed

1927 leadership convention 

(Held on March 20, 1927.)

Hugh Robson winner on first ballot, vote totals not announced
Fred C. Hamilton
A.W. Myles

1931 leadership convention 

(Held on June 26, 1931.)

Murdoch Mackay winner, vote totals not announced
Fred C. Hamilton

Liberal-Progressive Party period

No leadership conventions were held during the existence of the Liberal-Progressive Party (1932–1961). John Bracken was leader of the Progressive Party of Manitoba when the Liberal-Progressive coalition was formed in 1932, and was subsequently recognized as the leader of the merged party. Stuart Garson was the unanimous choice of coalition Members of the Legislative Assembly (MLAs) to replace Bracken, in a vote held on December 22, 1942.

In 1948, Douglas L. Campbell was selected as Premier by a vote among MLAs in the governing Liberal-Progressive/Progressive Conservative coalition, defeating Progressive Conservative leader Errick Willis.

1961 leadership convention 

(Held on April 20, 1961.)

Gildas Molgat 475
Stan Roberts 279
Francis Bud Jobin 79
Lloyd Henderson 27

1969 leadership convention 

(Held on May 10, 1969.)

Robert Bend 877
Duncan Edmonds 483
Bernie Wolfe 142
Lloyd Henderson 16
Gildas Molgat 3 (these ballots were spoiled; Molgat was not a candidate)

1970 leadership convention 

(Held on October 31, 1970.)

Israel Asper 720
John Nesbitt 329

1975 leadership convention 

(Held on February 22, 1975.)

Charles Huband 381
Lloyd Henderson 87

1980 leadership convention 

(Held on November 30, 1980.)

Doug Lauchlan 493
Hugh Moran 300

Bill Jackson was originally a candidate, but dropped out in October 1980. He had been considered a frontrunner.

1984 leadership convention 

(Held on, March 4, 1984.)

Sharon Carstairs 307
Bill Ridgeway 238
Alan de Jardin 21
Stephen Zaretski 11

1993 leadership election 

(Held on June 5, 1993.)

Paul Edwards 1,087
Kevin Lamoureux 851

1996 leadership election 

(Held on October 16, 1996.)

Ginny Hasselfield 958
Kevin Lamoureux 937

Had the results not been weighted by constituency, Lamoureux would have defeated Hasselfield by 1,019 votes to 997.

1998 leadership election 

(Held on October 17, 1998.)

Jon Gerrard 1,336
Jerry Fontaine 832

2013 leadership election
(Held on October 26, 2013)

Rana Bokhari 431
Dougald Lamont 285
Bob Axworthy 131

2017 leadership election
(To be held October 21, 2017, in Winnipeg)

First ballot
Cindy Lamoureux 363
Dougald Lamont 301
Jon Gerrard 230
Gerrard eliminated, endorses Lamoureux

Second ballot
Dougald Lamont 296
Cindy Lamoureux 288

See also
leadership convention
Manitoba Liberal Party

Footnotes

Liberal